Grayson B. Lookner is an American politician who has served as a member of the Maine House of Representatives since 2020. He represents the 37th House District as a member of the Democratic Party. Lookner is a member of Democratic Socialists of America.

Lookner serves on the Criminal Justice and Public Safety Committee, and in his first term introduced legislation to regulate the use of facial surveillance technology by authorities, as well as a bill that would have closed Long Creek Youth Development Center, Maine's last remaining Youth Prison. Both bills passed both chambers of the Legislature, but the bill to close Long Creek was vetoed by Governor Janet Mills.

Early life and education 
Raised in Camden, Maine, Lookner attended Prescott College.

Career 
After college, he worked in healthcare, wilderness guiding, and community organizing. He worked in progressive political organizations and on progressive presidential campaigns.

See also
 List of Democratic Socialists of America who have held office in the United States

References 

Living people
Democratic Socialists of America politicians from Maine
Democratic Party members of the Maine House of Representatives
People from Camden, Maine
Politicians from Portland, Maine
Prescott College alumni
Year of birth missing (living people)